The Bearskin Fire was a wildfire in Valley County, Idaho in the United States, 21 miles northeast of Lowman.

Events

The Bearskin Fire was reported on August 23, 2017, at 7:30 PM. Firefighters responded to the fire on August 25, which had burned  upon their arrival. The area where the fire was discovered is very remote, with the fire being fueled by dead and down lodgepole pine and sub-alpine fir timber. The crew used a confinement strategy due to fears about firefighter safety and lack of resources available due to other fires burning in the state. 

At that time, 100 fire personnel were fighting the fire. Crews focused on removing roadside vegetation from nearby National Forest System roads, Deer Flat Campground, and an Idaho Power weather station. The Deer Flat Campground was closed. 

Closures were expanded to the entire area surrounding the fire, specifically the Lowman Ranger District in the Boise National Forest.

The fire almost doubled overnight, expanding to  due to winds ahead of thunderstorms. The fire had crossed a National Forest System road and moved closer to the Deer Flat Campground and into the Little Beaver Creek drainage. Numerous National Forest System road were closed. The Deadwood Reservoir and all nearby campgrounds were closed. 

By the evening of September 2, the fire had grown , burning approximately four miles north of Deadwood Reservoir, burning up steep and rough terrain. This led to Clear Creek Road to be closed. Additionally, the fire had moved closer to Deadwood Reservoir and headed into the Warm Springs and Wilson drainages. Crews chipped felled trees and removed corridor snags. 

As of September 9, the fire had spread to the ridgeline of Mount Pilgrim, threatening the Deadwood Outfitters lodge. By September 15, leadership had reduced closures on Boise and Salmon Challis National Forest, providing access to the land for hunters and general recreation. Many areas of the Boise National Forest remain closed due to the impact of the fire.

References

External links
 

2017 Idaho wildfires
Valley County, Idaho
Wildfires in Idaho